"What You Do to Me" is a song recorded by Scottish rock band Teenage Fanclub. The song was released on 27 January 1992 through Creation Records, as the third single from the band's third studio album Bandwagonesque. The song was written and sung by vocalist and guitarist Norman Blake.

The song peaked at number 19 on Billboard Modern Rock Tracks chart in the US, and number 31 on the UK Singles Chart.

Charts

References

1992 singles
1991 songs
Creation Records singles